Dolenje Ponikve is a settlement in the Municipality of Trebnje in eastern Slovenia. It lies on the road leading south from Dolenja Nemška Vas towards Mirna Peč and Novo Mesto. The area is part of the historical region of Lower Carniola. The municipality is now included in the Southeast Slovenia Statistical Region.

References

External links

Dolenje Ponikve at Geopedia

Populated places in the Municipality of Trebnje